M3, M-3 or M03 may refer to:

Computing and electronics 
 Intel m3, a brand of microprocessors
 M.3 (aka NF1/NGSFF), a specification for internally mounted expansion cards
 Leica M3, a landmark 35mm rangefinder camera
 Modula-3 (M3), a programming language
 M3, a British peak programme meter standard used for measuring the volume of audio broadcasts
 m3, a macro processor for the AP-3 minicomputer, the predecessor to m4
 M3, a surface-mount version of the 1N4003 general-purpose silicon rectifier diode
 M3 (email client), an unreleased email client for the Vivaldi browser

Entertainment 
 M3, a comic book created by Vicente Alcazar
 M3 adapter, a Game Boy Advance movie player
 M3 (Canadian TV channel), a music and entertainment television channel
 M3 (Hungarian TV channel), a Hungarian television channel
 M3: Malay Mo Ma-develop, a 2010 Philippine TV series
 M3 Music Card, a 2007 flash-based MP3 player
 M3 Perfect, M3 Simply and M3 Real, Nintendo DS and 3DS storage devices
M3: Sono Kuroki Hagane, a 2014 Japanese anime television series

Military

Weapons 
 37 mm Gun M3, a light American anti-tank gun
 M3/M3E1 Multi-role Anti-armor Anti-tank Weapon System (MAAWS) (AKA: Carl Gustaf 8.4cm recoilless rifle), an 84 mm man-portable reloadable anti-tank recoilless rifle 
 90 mm Gun M1/M2/M3, an American anti-aircraft and anti-tank gun
 105 mm Howitzer M3, an American light artillery piece
 Benelli M3 Super 90, an Italian semi-automatic shotgun
 M3 20mm cannon, a United States development of the Hispano-Suiza HS.404
 M3 fighting knife, a World War II American issue knife
 M3 machine gun, a variant of the M2 Browning
 M3 submachine gun (AKA: Grease Gun), an American submachine gun
 M3 tripod, a modern tripod for the M2 Browning machine gun
 M3, a code name for a United States military mission at Roosevelt Roads Naval Station in Puerto Rico

Vehicles 
 M3 Amphibious Rig, a German self-propelled amphibious bridging vehicle
 M3 Bradley, an American infantry fighting vehicle
 M3 Gun Motor Carriage, American tank destroyer
 M3 half-track, an armored military vehicle
 M3 Lee, an American medium tank; also known as "M3 Grant" in Commonwealth service
 Panhard M3 PTT, a French armored personnel carrier
  (M3), a WWI British Royal Navy monitor
 M3 Ram, a Canadian cruiser tank
 M3 Scout Car, an American armored vehicle
 M3 Stuart, an American light tank
 , a Swedish Royal Navy mine layer
 , a Swedish Navy mine sweeper (1940–1955)
 , a British Royal Navy minelayer submarine of the post-WWI period

Music 
 Major third (M3), a type of musical interval
 Major thirds tuning (M3 tuning), a regular tuning with major-third intervals between successive strings
 Minor third (m3), a type of musical interval
 M3 (album), a 1999 album by Mushroomhead
 M3 (band), an American rock band
 M3 Classic Whitesnake, a band featuring Bernie Marsden, Micky Moody and Neil Murray
 M3 Records, a record label
 Korg M3, a workstation synthesizer

Science and medicine 
 m3, the cubic metre, a unit of volume
 M3, the minimal modular, but non-distributive lattice in mathematical order theory
 ATC code M03, Muscle relaxants, a subgroup of the Anatomical Therapeutic Chemical Classification System
 Messier 3 (M3), a globular cluster in the constellation Canes Venatici
 Muscarinic acetylcholine receptor M3, an acetylcholine receptor
 The M-3 (My Mood Monitor) Screen, a mental health symptom checklist

Transport

Air transport
 ABSA - Aerolinhas Brasileiras IATA airline designator M3, a cargo airline based in Campinas, Brazil
 Miles M.3 Falcon, a 1930s British four-seat cabin monoplane

Automobiles
 Bisu M3, a Chinese MPV
 BMW M3, a German compact performance car series
 BYD M3, a Chinese MPV
 Dongfeng Fengxing Lingzhi M3, a Chinese MPV
 Haima M3, a Chinese subcompact sedan
 JAC Refine M3, a Chinese MPV

Roads and routes
 Eastern Freeway (Melbourne), part of the M3 in Victoria, Australia
 EastLink (Melbourne), part of the M3 in Victoria, Australia
 Highway M03 (Ukraine), an international highway connecting Kiev with Dovzhansky 
 M3 highway (Russia), another name for the Ukraine Highway in Russia
 M-3 (Michigan highway), a state highway in the Detroit metropolitan area
 M3 motorway (disambiguation), several roads
 M3 (New York City bus), a New York City Bus route in Manhattan
 M3 Milton–City Centre, a bus route in Glasgow
 M3 (East London), a Metropolitan Route in East London, South Africa
 M3 (Cape Town), a Metropolitan Route in Cape Town, South Africa
 M3 (Pretoria), a Metropolitan Route in Pretoria, South Africa
 M3 (Port Elizabeth), a Metropolitan Route in Port Elizabeth, South Africa
 Route M-3 (MTA Maryland), a former bus route in Baltimore, Maryland
 Jalan Datuk Wira Poh Ah Tiam, numbered M3 in Malacca, Malaysia
 M3 Road (Zambia), road in Zambia

Rail transport
 LCDR M3 class, a steam locomotive class of the London, Chatham & Dover Railway
 M1/M3 (railcar), a Long Island Rail Road and Metro-North Railroad railcar
 Sri Lanka Railways M3, a diesel-electric locomotive class of Sri Lanka Railways
 Line M3 (Budapest Metro), the North-South Line of the Budapest Metro, Hungary
 M3 (Copenhagen) (City Circle Line or Cityringen), a future expansion of the Copenhagen Metro
 M3 (Istanbul Metro), a rapid transit line in the European part of Istanbul, Turkey
 Milan Metro Line 3, a subway line serving Milan, Italy

Other uses 
 M3, an ISO metric screw thread size
 M3 (economics), a measure of the money supply
 M3 (hieroglyph), the Ancient Egyptian baker's tool hieroglyph
 MLBB M3 World Championship, the third esports world championship for the mobile game Mobile Legends: Bang Bang held in 2021
 M3, a difficulty grade in mixed climbing

See also 

 
 
 MMM (disambiguation)
 3M (disambiguation)
 M1903 (disambiguation)
 MThree (Coquitlam), a high-rise condominium in British Columbia
 List of highways numbered 3